Zhou Ming (born 7 January 1970) is a retired Chinese athlete who specialised in the long jump. He represented his country at the 1993 World Indoor Championships in Toronto finishing seventh.

His personal bests in the event are 8.12 metres outdoors (Changsha 1992) and 7.88 metres indoors (Toronto 1993).

Competition record

References

1970 births
Living people
Chinese male long jumpers
20th-century Chinese people